Richard Corcoran (born March 16, 1965) is an American politician and former speaker of the Florida House of Representatives. A Republican, Corcoran represented the 37th District, which includes central Pasco County, from 2012 to 2018, and previously represented the 45th District from 2010 to 2012. From 2019 to 2022, Corcoran served as the state's education commissioner.

Early life and education
Born in Canada, Richard Corcoran grew up in Pasco County, Florida, where his family moved when he was 11. His parents were both veterans of World War II. His father was an American soldier in the U.S. Army and his mother, a daughter of a British tea-planter, served in the Women's Auxiliary Air Force of the Royal Air Force during the London Blitz.

Corcoran dropped out of University of Florida. He later attended St. Leo College, graduating in 1989, and Regent University, where he received his Juris Doctor in 1996. While enrolled in college, he served six years in the United States Naval Reserve (1987–1993).

Political career
Corcoran's first job after college was with Rep. John Renke of New Port Richey, who was poised to be Florida House minority leader before his defeat to Democrat Phil Mishkin in a race orchestrated by House speaker and future FSU president T K Wetherell. He then worked as a legislative aide for his friend Paul Hawkes, representative in the Florida House from 1990 to 1994. Corcoran ran the 1994 campaign that took Mike Fasano, later Majority leader and Senate President, to the Florida House for the first time. Between 1996 and 1998, he was deputy to Daniel Webster, the first Republican House speaker in a century.

In 1998, Corcoran ran and lost his first House race to Nancy Argenziano.

In June 1999, Corcoran filed for Chapter 7 bankruptcy.

Corcoran was admitted to the Florida Bar on September 21, 1999, three years after completing law school.

He worked as outside counsel for former House Speaker Tom Feeney in 2002.

Chief of Staff to Marco Rubio (2006–2010)
In 2006, Corcoran worked for candidate Marco Rubio, whose committee paid him $113,000 to write and promote Rubio's political tract 100 Innovative Ideas for Florida's Future. After that year's election, he became chief of staff to the new House Speaker at a salary of $175,000 per year. He resigned to prepare for a 2007 state Senate by-election but dropped out rather than face Democrat Charlie Dean. Corcoran was hired by future governor Rick Scott to do legal work for Solantic.

When Corcoran was chief aide to Marco Rubio, his spending of Republican Party of Florida funds drew scrutiny and spending on flights, hotels, and restaurants from party coffers in 2015 and 2016 also drew critics. Corcoran rejected suggestions that the spending (such as an $8,000 meal at The French Laundry in Napa Valley) was excessive.

Florida House of Representatives (2010–2018)
When incumbent state representative Tom Anderson was unable to seek re-election due to term limits in 2010, Corcoran ran to succeed him in the 45th District, which included parts of southern Pasco County and northern Pinellas County.

During his election, Corcoran secured promises from fellow Republican representatives to elect him speaker for the 2016–2018 legislative session. His leading rival for the position was fellow freshman representative Matt Gaetz. At the time, he released an 80-page reform manifesto entitled Blue Print Florida.

In 2011, he was hired as counsel at the Tampa offices of the law firm Broad and Cassel.

When the state legislative districts were redrawn in 2012, Corcoran was drawn into the 37th District, which included some of the areas in Pasco County that he represented in the 45th District. Corcoran faced a challenge from Strother Hammond in the Republican primary. He was endorsed for re-election by The Tampa Tribune. Corcoran defeated Hammond, gathering nearly 84% of the vote.  Corcoran was subsequently re-elected without opposition in both 2014 and 2016.

During his time as representative, he led an effort to oppose Medicaid expansion. He curried controversy with Governor Rick Scott by attacking Enterprise Florida and Visit Florida.

Following his 2016 election, Corcoran became speaker of the Florida House of Representatives for the 2016–2018 legislative session. As House leader, Corcoran was criticized for the "pugnacious manner and determination that have become his hallmarks." In 2017, Senator Jack Latvala said, "I've been up there [at the Florida Legislature] 22 years, and he has flat picked more fights with more people than anybody I've ever seen before." In 2018, he described the Florida teachers' union as "disgusting", "repugnant", and "downright evil". In a 2017 profile recounting his shouting and cursing, Corcoran told a reporter, "I'm the most disruptive person."

In January 2018, Corcoran stated that between 2007 and 2018, he witnessed "probably less than ten" legislators engaging in sexual harassment and misconduct in the Florida legislature. He did not name the individuals, nor did he report any of the incidents to authorities.

In January 2018, Corcoran's PAC Watchdog USA began airing ads as he explored a run for governor. In April, before officially announcing a run, his candidacy was endorsed by Matt Gaetz. Ultimately, Corcoran endorsed Adam Putnam in the race, which was won by Ron DeSantis.

Education Commissioner of Florida (2018–2022)
On December 6, 2018, Governor-elect of Florida Ron DeSantis announced he would nominate Corcoran to be education commissioner. Corcoran was unanimously confirmed as education commissioner by the Florida Board of Education on December 17, 2018, and took office on January 8, 2019, upon the effectiveness of the resignation of his predecessor, Pam Stewart.

Corcoran was appointed by a unanimous vote of the Florida Board of Education, which is appointed by the governor. Critics pointed to Corcoran's lack of education credentials or experience. Others pointed to conflicts of interest due to his wife Anne Corcoran's position as CEO of a charter school. She has worked with conservative groups such as Hillsdale College to influence the creation of a controversial new civics curriculum for Florida.

Corcoran's tenure has been characterized by conflictual relations with many school districts and superintendents. He has sought expanded powers to take over governance of school districts whose boards and officials disagree with his policies.

Corcoran's management of school reopening during the Covid-19 pandemic has been another source of friction. On July 7, 2020, President Donald Trump tweeted "Schools must open in the fall", the same day that Corcoran ordered all public and private brick-and-mortar schools to reopen in August for at least five days per week and provide a "full-array" of services. That day, the COVID-19 pandemic in Florida resulted in 11,385 new COVID-19 cases and 63 deaths, totaling to 213,797 cases and 3,841 deaths. On August 7, 2020, Corcoran delivered a letter that denied Hillsborough County School Board's request to open the school year exclusively online. In April 2021, Corcoran wrote to school districts stating that there was no strong evidence that mask wearing slowed the spread of COVID-19 at schools.

In March 2021, the Duval County school district removed a secondary school teacher from classroom teaching. While the district did not specify the cause of removal, a Southern Poverty Law Center lawsuit alleged that the cause was Donfrio's posting of a Black Lives Matter flag and anti-racist content in her teaching. Responding to questions following a speech at Hillsdale College in early May, Corcoran announced that it was he who made the decision to fire Donfrio: "We made sure she was terminated and now we're being sued by every one of the liberal left groups who say it's freedom of speech issue" and accused the teacher of having her "entire classroom memorialized to Black Lives Matter".

In May 2021, Corcoran submitted an application to succeed John Thrasher as President of Florida State University, and the selection committee advanced him along with eight others for on campus interviews. Media reports portrayed Corcoran as the inside candidate. On May 13, the Southern Association of Colleges and Schools addressed a letter of concern to the Florida Board of Governors describing a conflict of interest due to Corcoran's membership on the board that appointed the selection committee and would decide the appointment. Corcoran was not among the finalists named on May 15.

Bid-rigging Scandal 
In 2022, Corcoran came under scrutiny when the DOE was shown to be in talks with MGT Consulting, a firm led by Corcoran's longtime colleague Trey Traviesa, for some time before the bidding on a multimillion-dollar educational services contract was opened for a single week, a situation that appeared to allow the firm preferential access. Out of 25 firms sent a request for quotes, only MGT responded within the one-week deadline. One week prior to the bidding being opened, Corcoran had hosted a closed-door meeting between Traviesa, Jefferson County school officials, and charter school lobbyist Ralph Arza. 

State investigators learned of the improprieties when a new company formed by two of Corcoran's deputies, Strategic Initiatives Partners, also applied for the Jefferson County contract on the final day of bidding. The DOE inspector general opened a probe as a conflict-of-interest investigation into Strategic Initiatives Partners and issued an inconclusive report. The two Strategic Initiatives principals working in Corcoran's department resigned, and Gov. DeSantis' office declared the matter closed. However, state Democratic lawmakers then requested that the U.S. Department of Education’s inspector general look further into the issue because the funds for the contract were allocated from federal COVID-19 relief funds.

On May 1, 2022, Corcoran stepped down as education commissioner.

Interim President of New College of Florida
On January 6, 2023, Florida Governor Ron DeSantis appointed six new members to the board of New College of Florida, with a mandate to remake the institution as a conservative college. At its first meeting, on January 31, 2023, the new board fired President Patricia Okker and installed Corcoran as its interim president. He was paid a base salary of $699,000, which is $400,000 more than his predecessor made.

At the time the interim appointment was announced, Corcoran was still registered as a lobbyist for educational concerns, including Charter Schools USA, Polk County Public Schools, and the University of Miami, among three dozen clients whose relationship he had reaffirmed earlier that month.

Political positions

Education 
Corcoran is an advocate for charter school expansion and private school vouchers. His brother Michael Corcoran is a lobbyist for charter school management company, Accelerated Learning Solutions, and his wife Anne helped found a charter school for whom she acts as CEO.
While speaker of the House, Corcoran criticized a Florida Education Association lawsuit and described teachers unions as "literally trying to destroy the lives of 100,000 children. Most of them are minorities, and all of them are poor. ... It is downright evil."

In 2017, Corcoran passed his "schools of hope" bill, which funds new charter schools to open near public schools reporting weak results in standardized assessments. In the 2018 legislative session, he passed his "hope scholarships" bill, which funds private school vouchers for "bullied" public school students. The program has been criticized for lack of oversight and accountability. Critics point out that vouchers are not reserved for those who need them, but are freely offered to families that do not need financial assistance. Vouchers also provide a means for wealthy companies to skip paying state taxes.

Immigration 
During the run-up to the 2018 Florida gubernatorial campaign, Corcoran's Watchdog USA PAC ran an ad targeting so-called sanctuary cities. During the 2018 legislative session, he backed HP9, which pre-empted local policies about non-cooperation with ICE.

Culture wars 
Corcoran is tied to leading right-wing education culture warriors. On February 5, 2018, Corcoran served as honorary master of ceremonies for a speech by Dinesh D'Souza at a Naples fundraising dinner for conservative education activist group Florida Citizens Alliance. In May 2021, Hillsdale College president Larry Arnn called him "one of the most important men in the United States today." During the same speech, Corcoran stated, "Education is our sword, that's our weapon ... There's going to be a battle ... The way we're going to get to where we're gonna get is by fighting every step of the way ... The whole argument on university campuses, there is no truth, it's all subjective."

Florida legislative process 
Corcoran's 2010 manifesto promised to delegate leadership power with committee chairs and members in a way that "gives all legislators equal footing." The claimed objective was to dilute the influence of lobbyists. Once he became Speaker in 2016, however, his style proved far more directive.

Personal life 
Corcoran resides in Land o' Lakes, Florida. His wife, Anne Corcoran, is active in the Barney Charter School Initiative affiliated with Hillsdale College. They have six children, who were homeschooled and then attended Classical Prep in Spring Hill, Florida, which Anne Corcoran founded and where she acted as CEO. She is a lawyer with Nelson Mullins in Tallahassee.

Richard Corcoran's brother is Michael Corcoran, a leading political and corporate lobbyist in Tallahassee and Tampa. His sister Jacqueline is a former Washington, DC political operative and current lobbyist with Corcoran Partners.

References

External links

Florida House of Representatives - Richard Corcoran
Corcoran for State House

|-

|-

|-

1965 births
21st-century American politicians
Living people
People from Land o' Lakes, Florida
Regent University School of Law alumni
Saint Leo University alumni
Speakers of the Florida House of Representatives
Republican Party members of the Florida House of Representatives